is a Japanese actor.  His breakthrough film was Waterboys for which he was nominated for the 'Best Actor' award at the Japanese Academy Awards, and won the 'Newcomer of the Year' prize.  He is also the bassist and lead singer of the Japanese band Basking Lite.

Filmography

Film

TV dramas

Puppetry
 Sherlock Holmes (2014 NHK) as Jefferson Hope (voice)

Awards and nominations

References

External links

Official agency profile 
 

1980 births
Living people
Japanese male film actors
Japanese male television actors
People from Yanagawa, Fukuoka
Actors from Fukuoka Prefecture
Taiga drama lead actors
Horipro artists
20th-century Japanese male actors
21st-century Japanese male actors